Location scouting is a vital  process in the pre-production stage of filmmaking and commercial photography. Once scriptwriters, producers or directors have decided what general kind of scenery they require for the various parts of their work that is shot outside of the studio, the search for a suitable place or "location" outside the studio begins. Location scouts also look for generally spectacular or interesting locations beforehand, to have a database of locations in case of requests.

Location scouts often negotiate legal access to filming locations.

Location requirements 
Suitability of a location to the task at hand takes into consideration many factors, including:
overall aesthetic
financial cost to production
logistic feasibility including but not limited to distance from base of operations or other locations scheduled
availability of parking and facilities to keep crew and talent (principal actors or models and extras) safe and dry at all times
availability of electrical power or feasibility of bringing in generators for lights and electrical equipment.
available light (indoors or outdoors) and weather conditions (outdoors)
permission from and cooperation of location owner and neighbors, local government and law enforcement

Work process
Typically ideas for what a filming location should or could be are discussed between production department and locations department (it could be at this point that the locations department is actually created), then research is begun to actually find and document that location using location scout(s).
 
The location scouts and other Locations Department staff (see below), working under the supervision of the Location Manager, generally strive to provide as many potentially useful/viable ideas and/or options as possible for review by production; often the Assistant Director, Production Manager and subsequently, the Director or even the Executive Producer in the case of narrative filmmaking.

Once a consensus on locations with the most potential is reached, arrangements are normally made for some of the heads of the other Production Departments to tour those location(s) to confirm suitability. This tour is commonly called a "tech scout", "recce" or "go-see".

During this time the Locations Department (most likely the Location Manager in situations requiring the most responsibility) will have contacted and begun negotiation with internal and external parties that may affect ability to film at the location. This is known as "clearing the location": investigating and confirming availability and fees to be paid to a location owner or agent, obtaining a certificate of insurance, obtaining any needed film permits (may involve fees). Also, there might be distribution of "resident letters" or "filming notifications". These are notices to neighbors, advising them of intent to film in the area (often a local requirement). These steps result in "locking down": making sure that all details and existing or potential issues are addressed. While it is the Locations Department's job to anticipate and minimize problems associated with a location, it is also the Locations Department's duty to advise other Production Department heads of intractable problems that need consideration so contingencies can be planned. This may lead to a decision to use an alternate location. This might involve additional planning and budget allocation for additional location scouting.

Change management
Production events involving the Location Department and its personnel can occur very quickly and quite often, the requirements themselves; that is, script rewrite(s), creative concept change(s), of a location itself can change on the fly. More often than not, multiple locations associated with multiple scenes in production are involved; under some circumstances, a busy and resourceful freelancer or Locations Department Staffer could be involved in multiple projects simultaneously.

Booking a site
After completing all the steps above, if a location is still viable and available, it is confirmed (booked). Usually a contract is signed by all parties, and a property release is obtained: a written, signed permission from the property owner or agent allowing photography of and public depiction via media (that is, broadcast, video, film, print publication).

Once a location is booked, there are very few reasons for filming to not commence as planned. At this point many man-hours of paid production work and considerable amounts of money for location fees and/or permits have been invested in the chosen location. A change of creative concept at this stage or glitch of any kind (such as property owner cancellation) is potentially costly, and legal action is a possible consequence. Also, if production misrepresents itself regarding its activities, intended use of the location, damages the property or negligently causes other problems for the property owner, the property owner may seek remedy in any of many forms available, including legal action.

Consideration of weather
Local weather conditions can figure heavily into a location's viability and affect many areas of production scheduling, so contingencies and alternate, budgetary-efficient plans should be made well in advance of any shoot day with a possibility to be affected by weather. A location with potential to be affected by weather should always be cleared and placed, in advance, with the property owner's understanding and consent "on weather hold" or under the condition that production will only confirm use of the location and commence photography pending viable weather conditions. The aim, in addition to the obvious goal of attaining the correct aesthetic for the shot in acceptable and safe working conditions is also geared toward providing greater flexibility of crew scheduling, equipment, vehicle, etc. rentals and other production aspects and minimize inconvenience to the owner and in the event of cancellation or postponement by production due to weather, eliminate or minimize cancellation fees as may be part of an agreement between production and the location.

Locations for various media
In addition to feature films and short films, television commercials and television shows, documentary films, corporate video, print advertising photography, editorial photography and even event planning all have the possibility to employ location scouts to find and photograph locations for their productions.

The methods employed are much the same as for feature film production, but the processes often differ in some ways:

Turn around times are generally shorter and the decision making is shared between production, the director/photographer and the advertising agency or even the end client. A weekly broadcast television show may have significant deadline challenges for obvious reasons.

Often the decision makers are geographically dispersed, which may explain why commercial and print scouts have been early adopters of online presentations and other digital technologies.

Additional duties 
The Locations Department's duties  often extend beyond pre-production and into actual production as well as after filming at the location has completed; a Location Manager and/or other Locations Department members are often needed during actual shooting and at wrap to be a general point of internal contact for matters related to the Locations Department such as ensuring smooth crew movement to and from the location, answering locations-related questions/ solving misc problems as may arise, coordinating crowd control and as an external point of contact between production and such parties as perhaps the property owner, neighbors, local film office/government and law enforcement.

Locations Department personnel are always the last crew to leave a location and the credo is to leave the location in the same (if not better) condition than it was found.

Job titles and job descriptions
A film crew might have the following titled positions staffed in regard to the Locations Department. Many of the positions often "cross over" or a member of the department might "wear several hats":

Location Manager
Oversees the Locations Department and its staff, typically reporting directly to the Production Manager and/or Assistant Director (or even Director and/or Executive Producer). Location Manager is responsible for final clearing (or guaranteeing permission to use) a location for filming and must often assist Production/Finance Dept(s) in maintaining budget management regarding actual location/permit fees as well as labor costs to production for himself and the Locations Department at large.

Assistant Location Manager
Works with the Location Manager and the various departments in arranging technical scouts for the essential staff (grips, electric, camera, etc.) to see options which the Location Manager has selected for filming.  The Assistant Location Manager will be onset during the filming process to oversee the operation, whereas the Location Manager continues preproduction from elsewhere (generally an office) on the upcoming locations.  (Note: On most location-based television shows, there will be two Assistant Location Managers that alternate episodes, allowing one to prep an upcoming episode while the other is on set with the current one.)

Location Scout
Does much of the actual research, footwork and photography to document location possibilities. Often the Location Manager will do some scouting themselves, as well as the Assistant Location Manager.

Location Researcher/Coordinator
On a large film crew someone might be assigned exclusively to do research work for the Locations Department, freeing the Location Scout(s) to concentrate on photographing location possibilities or other tasks. This person's job might be to do internet or public library research and contact resources to assess said resource's interest in being involved in the film project and if such interest exists, the location researcher might be responsible for setting up an appointment for a location scout to go there.

Location Assistant
Hired by the Location Manager to be on-set before, during, and after the filming process.  General responsibilities can include arriving first at the location to allow the set dressers into the set for preparation; maintaining the cleanliness of the location areas during filming (on larger budget projects this can include securing and supervising a contract clean-up crew or assigning such duties to a set PA); limiting the impact of a working production crew on the location grounds; fielding complaints from neighbors; and ultimately, at the end of the filming, managing on-set time and crew with regard to the closure of the location within contractually-permitted time constraints.  There are generally one to three assistants on a shoot at any given time.

Location Production Assistant
This position exists generally on larger budget productions.  The Locations PA is the assistant who is almost never onset, but instead is always "prepping" a location or "wrapping" a location.  That is, when a location requires several days of set up and breakdown prior and following the day(s) of filming.

Parking Coordinator
Typically hired by Location Manager on an as-need basis to supervise Parking Staff in order to secure and coordinate crew parking including equipment trucks and personal vehicles. Locations Department and Parking Department might work together with local law enforcement to coordinate traffic control if the scene being filmed involves roadway right-of-way in any way.

Parking Staff
Parking Staff hang up the brightly colored signs that declare No Parking and then sit in their cars (with an orange cone on the top) to ensure that no one parks in the coned off areas.

Waste Removal
Location Department's disposition is to be the last to depart a location upon wrap and to leave the location in exactly if not better condition as it existed upon arrival. A waste removal company might be hired on an as-need basis.

Methods
A location scout typically takes descriptive, panoramic photographs or video of location possibilities. A good location scout will make  photos of a location possibility that reflect the aesthetic goals of the production and will also include visually descriptive utilitarian photography and information in his presentation, documenting much more than just what will potentially appear onscreen.

Additional descriptive information might include (as might be relevant):
Reverse/alternate angle (photographing toward where camera might be), panoramic photography, to show space available for camera, lighting, video assist, hair and makeup (and clients on a commercial shoot)
Geographic coordinates, compass directions, other map data as may be applicable
Ambient lighting conditions at various times of day (or night), solar data; that is, angle of sun at different times of day
Photos of holding/staging areas and available parking and/or parking restriction signage
Hand sketches of street/building layout(s), building/room floor plan(s), room or area dimension data
Crew/vehicle access data; 'that is, doorways, hallways, elevators, stairs, availability and information of personnel needed for access
Notes regarding ambient sound conditions
On the shoot day, if a set is to be "dressed" (props/furniture added or (re)moved), Locations Department and/or Art Department/Property Master Staff/Prop Stylist will photograph the specific areas to be affected so as to assure that the location will be returned to its original state once filming is completed.

References

See also 
Location manager, the person responsible for the locations department
Recce, reconnaissance visit to a shooting location
Teamsters International Brotherhood of Teamsters (IBT), the American labor union representing commercial location scouts in California, New York and other filmmaking markets. The DGA (Directors Guild of America) represent Location Managers in Chicago and New York.
Location Managers Guild International, a guild representing location scouts.
Filming location, filming location
Filmmaking, film production
Television advertisement, television advertisement
Location library, location library

Filmmaking occupations
Film location shooting